Spy Girl (lit. "Those Who Don't Know Her Are Spies") is a 2004 South Korean film starring Kim Jung-hwa and Gong Yoo.,

Plot
A group of students run a website devoted to the girls who work at their local Burger King. When Ko-bong falls head over heels with new girl Hyo-jin, he promptly posts some pictures of her on the internet, and before long she becomes something of a local celebrity. However, little does he realize that his would-be girlfriend is in fact a North Korean spy who is trying to keep a low profile.

Cast
 Kim Jung-hwa - Park Hyo-jin
 Gong Yoo - Choi Go-bong
 Nam Sang-mi - Nam Jin-ah
 Baek Il-seob - Park Mu-sun
 Kim Ae-kyung - Oh Mi-jae
 Jadu - Park Hyo-jin
 Jo Dal-hwan - Song Hyo-guk
 Ahn Hae-suk - Ko-bong's mother
 Kim Myung-guk - Ko-bong's father
 Yoo In-young - Woo Wol-ran
 Park Kyung-hwan - Man in black suit
 Kim Ki-hwan - Male student
 Lee Kwang-ki - Kim Young-kwang
 Baek Seung-hee - Young woman
 Park Jin-taek - Manager

References

External links
 
 
 

2004 romantic comedy films
2004 films
2000s Korean-language films
South Korean spy comedy films
2000s spy comedy films
Showbox films
South Korean romantic comedy films
2000s South Korean films